Adromischus hemisphaericus is a perennial, succulent plant in the Crassulaceae family. It is commonly called Brosplakkies (brittle patches). The species is endemic to the Western Cape, South Africa.

Description 
Adromischus hemisphaericus is a small, decumbent, branching plant which tends to vary in its habit. The grey branches mature with peeling bark and reach 8 mm in diameter. Young branches are purplish-green and mature to grey. The leaves, grey with purple spots, can flake with wax. They are mostly flat and ovate, with slightly convex upper and lower faces, and can reach 3.5 cm long and 2.4 cm wide. Mid-summer brings inflorescences reaching 25 cm tall with many tubular flowers. The greenish-brown sepals are topped with triangular, light pink petals.

Etymology 
The genus name, Adromischus, comes from Greek, Adro- meaning 'thick' and -mischus meaning 'stem'.  The species name, hemisphaericus, means 'hemispherical' in Latin, an epithet for its leaf shape.

Distribution 
Adromischus hemisphaericus is endemic to the Western Cape, South Africa. Populations occur on the Cape Peninsula, and sparsely east of the Hottentots Holland Mountains, and from Caledon to Worcester.

References 

hemisphaericus
Flora of South Africa
Plants described in 1852